Cyrtodactylus edwardtaylori is a species of Asian bent-toed gecko, a lizard in the family Gekkonidae. The species, which is endemic to Sri Lanka, was originally described by Batuwita and Bahir in 2005.

Etymology
The specific name, edwardtaylori, is in honor of American herpetologist Edward Harrison Taylor.

Description
Cyrtodactylus edwardtaylori can grow to a snout–vent length of at least . The number of scales under the fourth toe of C. edwardtaylori range from 7–8. The claws are short. The mental is subpentagonal. Midbody scales are in 29–30 rows. The head is not depressed. A preanal groove is absent.

The dorsum is light brown with dark-brown bands. There is a pale canthal stripe.

Geographic range

Reproduction
C. edwardtaylori is oviparous.

References

Further reading
Somaweera R, Somaweera N (2009). Lizards of Sri Lanka: A Colour Guide with Field Keys. Frankfurt am Main: Edition Chimaira / Serpents Tale. 304 pp. .

Cyrtodactylus
Reptiles of Sri Lanka
Endemic fauna of Sri Lanka
Reptiles described in 2005